is a Japanese short experimental film made by Shūji Terayama in 1970. A 27-minute cut was released in 1971. A "director's cut" of sorts, attempting to recreate the film as originally made, was released as a 75-minute feature in 1996, thirteen years after Terayama's death.

A twelve-minute abridgement of the film, was also released in 1971.

Plot
Set in an indeterminate future in which children have overthrown adults and established their own empire, the film does not have a central narrative or identifiable character roles. Rather it depicts a series of graphic tableaux in which children (played onscreen by actual children) engage in cruel and abusive acts against the adults under their dominion. These include scenes of child soldiers arresting, enslaving, executing, and raping helpless victims, often held at gunpoint.

A constitution is read aloud, establishing the basic laws of the empire and the supremacy of children over adults. The title of "Emperor Tomato Ketchup" is derived from the stipulated favorite food of children enshrined in the constitution. The titular boy emperor lazily lords over his parents and shows disinterest in the young girl who is his designated concubine. He later sexually assaults a glamorous woman, suckling on her breasts and placing his head between her thighs.

The film includes scenes of animal abuse, drag play, fascism, Nazism, racism, rape, the Ku Klux Klan, nudity, and sexual fetishism as well as pantomimed erotic acts involving both children and adults.

Reception 

Rex Reed described the film as an "avant-garde porno flick" and "the most disgusting thing [he]'d ever seen", writing in The New York Daily News that it caused a "scandal" in Paris, where he saw it.

Writing retrospectively in visual arts journal Afterall, Thomas Dylan Eaton describes the longer cut of the film, which in his opinion is Terayama's most "disturbing", as a "triumphant insurrection [against] film", although being, if not "scatological", then containing "malignant humour [...] more often offensive than amusing".

Awards 
The film had the honor of being shown at a very early edition of the Quinzaine des Réalisateurs, an independent selection of Cannes, in 1972.

Cast
 Keiko Niitaka
 Salvador Tari
 Tarō Apollo
 Mitsufumi Hashimoto

Influence
 The British alternative rock band Stereolab named their 1996 album Emperor Tomato Ketchup after the film.

References

External links
 

1971 films
Films directed by Shūji Terayama
Japanese avant-garde and experimental films
Obscenity controversies in film
1970s Japanese films
1990s Japanese films